The Tiny Bell Trio is the second album by trumpeter Dave Douglas and the first to feature his Tiny Bell Trio.  It was released on the Canadian Songlines label in 1994 and features performances by Douglas, Brad Shepik and Jim Black.

Reception
The Allmusic review by David R. Adler states "the Tiny Bell Trio produces a remarkably full sound despite its sparse instrumentation... Douglas's goal here is to absorb musical influences from the Balkans and Europe... As an early glimpse of Douglas's unconventional brilliance, this one is well worth checking out". The album was identified by Chris Kelsey in his Allmusic essay "Free Jazz: A Subjective History" as one of the 20 Essential Free Jazz Albums.

Track listing
 "Red Emma" - 4:55  
 "Punchy" - 4:59  
 "Road/Home" - 6:39  
 "Head-On Kouvlodsko" - 5:04  
 "The Drowned Girl" (Weill) - 4:56  
 "La Belle Saison" (Kosma) - 0:43  
 "Song for My Father-In-Law" - 5:47  
 "Shards" - 4:02  
 "Felijar" (Schoeppach) - 5:43  
 "Fille d'Acier (Girl of Steel)" (Kosma) - 4:52  
 "Arabesque for Clarinet and Piano" (Tailleferre) - 3:57  
 "Czardas" (Traditional Hungarian) - 3:11  
All compositions by Dave Douglas except as indicated

Personnel
Dave Douglas: trumpet
Brad Shepik: guitar
Jim Black: drums

References

1994 albums
Dave Douglas (trumpeter) albums